Udamadura Grama Niladhari Division is a Grama Niladhari Division of the Walapane Divisional Secretariat  of Nuwara Eliya District  of Central Province, Sri Lanka .  It has Grama Niladhari Division Code 518.

Udamadura  are located within, nearby or associated with Udamadura.

Udamadura is a surrounded by the Kalaganwatta, Ambanella, Galkadawela, Kosgolla, Udawela and Udamadura North  Grama Niladhari Divisions.

Demographics

Ethnicity 

The Udamadura Grama Niladhari Division has a Sinhalese majority (100.0%) . In comparison, the Walapane Divisional Secretariat (which contains the Udamadura Grama Niladhari Division) has a Sinhalese majority (63.0%) and a significant Indian Tamil population (33.8%)

Religion 

The Udamadura Grama Niladhari Division has a Buddhist majority (100.0%) . In comparison, the Walapane Divisional Secretariat (which contains the Udamadura Grama Niladhari Division) has a Buddhist majority (62.7%) and a significant Hindu population (33.1%)

References 

Grama Niladhari Divisions of Walapane Divisional Secretariat